Chung Shin-Cho (born January 6, 1940) is a retired amateur boxer from  South Korea. He competed at the 1960 and 1964 Olympics and won a silver medal in the bantamweight in 1964.

Results

References
 

1940 births
Sportspeople from Seoul
Flyweight boxers
Bantamweight boxers
Olympic boxers of South Korea
Olympic silver medalists for South Korea
Boxers at the 1960 Summer Olympics
Boxers at the 1964 Summer Olympics
Living people
Olympic medalists in boxing
Asian Games medalists in boxing
Boxers at the 1962 Asian Games
South Korean male boxers
Medalists at the 1964 Summer Olympics
Asian Games gold medalists for South Korea
Medalists at the 1962 Asian Games